Derzhprom is a station on Kharkiv Metro's Oleksiivska Line. The station opened on 6 May 1995.

External links
 

Kharkiv Metro stations
Railway stations opened in 1995